Invisible Child: Poverty, Survival & Hope in an American City is a book written by Andrea Elliott.

Reviews 
This book has been reviewed by editors of The New York Times, The Times, The Week, The Irish Times, NPR, The Guardian and The Washington Post.

Awards 

 Pulitzer Prize for General Nonfiction in 2022
 J. Anthony Lukas Book Prize in 2022
 Helen Bernstein Book Award for Excellence in Journalism in 2022
 Gotham Book Prize in 2022
 Finalist for Los Angeles Times Book Prize for Current Interest
 One of the Barack Obama's Favorite Book of the Year 2021
 Listed in "The 10 Best Books of 2021" by The New York Times
 Listed in "The 100 Must-Read Books Of 2021" by Time
 Listed in "Five of the Best Books of 2021" by The Atlantic
 Listed in "10 books to help you understand inequality — and possible solutions" by Los Angeles Times
 Listed in "8 New Books You Should Read in October" by Time

References 

2021 non-fiction books
Random House books
Brooklyn
Pulitzer Prize for General Non-Fiction winners
Pulitzer Prize for General Non-Fiction-winning works
J. Anthony Lukas Book Prize-winning works
Helen Bernstein Book Award for Excellence in Journalism